Villem is an Estonian masculine given name. It is a cognate of the English language William and the German Wilhelm  and may refer to:

Villem Gross (1922–2001), Estonian writer and journalist
Villem Grünthal-Ridala (1885–1942), Estonian poet, translator, linguist and folklorist
Villem Kapp (1913–1964), Estonian composer
Villem Maaker (1891–1966), Estonian politician
Villem Maasik (1883–1919), Estonian lawyer, trade unionist, and politician
Villem Orav (1883-1952), Estonian historian, teacher, and scholar of pedagogy
Villem Raam (1910-1996), Estonian art historian, art critic and conservator-restorer
Villem Reimann (1906–1992), Estonian composer and pedagogue
Villem Tammai (1892–1973), Estonian politician
Villem Tomiste (born 1975), Estonian architect
 

Estonian masculine given names